Howlin is a surname. Notable people with the surname include:

Brendan Howlin (born 1956), Irish politician
Frank Howlin (born 1966), Irish Gaelic footballer
Patricia Howlin, English psychiatrist

See also
Howland (surname)